Park Hye-mi is a South Korean taekwondo practitioner. 

She won a silver medal in lightweight at the 2007 World Taekwondo Championships, after being defeated by Karine Sergerie in the final. She won a gold medal at the 2008 Asian Taekwondo Championships. She participated in welterweight at the 2009 World Taekwondo Championships, where she was defeated by eventual gold medalist Gwladys Épangue at an early stage.

References

External links

Year of birth missing (living people)
Living people
South Korean female taekwondo practitioners
World Taekwondo Championships medalists
Asian Taekwondo Championships medalists
21st-century South Korean women